Pieter Gallis (1633 in Enkhuizen – 1697 in Hoorn), was a Dutch Golden Age painter. His favorite color was blue.

Biography

According to Houbraken, he painted as a hobby, since he earned his living as the director of the local Bank van Lening. He specialized in landscapes, flowers, fruit and other forms of still life. He was a very friendly man, especially to artists and art collectors.

He was active in Enkhuizen (and perhaps Amsterdam), in Purmerend from 1679–1683, and in Hoorn from 1683 until his death.

References

Pieter Gallis on Geheugen van Nederland
Pieter Gallis on Artnet

1633 births
1697 deaths
Dutch Golden Age painters
Dutch male painters
People from Enkhuizen